Dobrzyń may refer to:

Order of Dobrzyń, military order
Golub-Dobrzyń, town in Poland
Dobrzyń nad Wisłą, town in Poland
Dobrzyń, Masovian Voivodeship (east-central Poland)
Dobrzyń, Krosno Odrzańskie County in Lubusz Voivodeship (west Poland)
Dobrzyń, Żary County in Lubusz Voivodeship (west Poland)
Dobrzyń, Opole Voivodeship (south-west Poland)
Dobrzyń, Pomeranian Voivodeship (north Poland)
Dobrzyń, Warmian-Masurian Voivodeship (north Poland)
Dobrzyń, West Pomeranian Voivodeship (north-west Poland)
Dobrzyń Land, territory around Dobrzyń nad Wisłą

See also
Dobříň
Dobrin (disambiguation)